The International Festivals and Events Association (IFEA) is a not-for-profit association for producers, suppliers and managers of festivals and events, which range from small county and municipal events to large-scale parades that can have attendances in the hundreds of thousands. It has members in about 38 countries on 5 continents.

The IFEA was founded in 1956, and adopted its current name in the 1980s. It is based in  Boise, Idaho, United States.

The IFEA puts on a yearly international convention and expo for its members. The most recent convention and expo took place in Ottawa, Canada in September 2006. The IFEA also offers several educational courses which can lead to the professional designation of Certified Festival and Events Executive (CFEE).

The association presents the annual Haas Wilkerson Pinnacle Awards to members in Gold, Silver and Bronze to the top three of each category. In 2010, the Pasadena Tournament of Roses received 6 awards, 2 in gold, 3 in silver and one bronze.

References

National Capital Commission press release, September 20, 2006: National Capital Commission Wins International Festivals and Events Association Awards. Press release issued by the National Capital Commission, an agency of the Government of Canada.
 National Capital Commission press release, September 15, 2006: Representatives from the World's Leading Events and Festivals to Gather in Canada's Capital Region. Announcement about 51st IFEA Convention and Expo.
Daytona Beach Area Convention and Visitors Bureau, February 21, 2005: CVB Vice President named IFEA Foundation Chair

External links
Official Website
Tribal Reunion

Festival organizations
Non-profit organizations based in Idaho
Festivals
Festival organizations in North America
Entertainment companies established in 1956
1956 establishments in Idaho